The 1941–42 Montreal Canadiens season was the 33rd season in franchise history. The team placed sixth in the regular season to qualify for the playoffs. The Canadiens lost in the quarter-finals against the Detroit Red Wings 2 games to 1.

Regular season

Final standings

Record vs. opponents

Schedule and results

Playoffs
They went against Detroit in the first round in a best of three series and lost in 3 games, or 1–2.

Player statistics

Regular season
Scoring

Goaltending

Playoffs
Scoring

Goaltending

Awards and records

Transactions

See also
 1941–42 NHL season

References
Canadiens on Hockey Database
Canadiens on NHL Reference

Montreal Canadiens seasons
Montreal
Montreal
Montreal Canadiens
Montreal Canadiens